Denis Aleksandrovich Knitel (born 29 November 1977) is a Tajikistani professional footballer who also holds Russian citizenship.

Career statistics

International

Statistics accurate as of 8 September 2016

International goals
Scores and results list Tajikistan's goal tally first.

Honours
Varzob Dushanbe
Tajik League (3): 1998, 1999, 2000
Tajik Cup (1): 1999

References

1977 births
Living people
Tajikistani footballers
Tajikistani expatriate footballers
Tajikistan international footballers
FC Zhemchuzhina Sochi players
Tajikistani people of German descent

Association football defenders